The 2008 United States presidential election in Washington took place on November 4, 2008, and was part of the 2008 United States presidential election. Voters chose 11 representatives, or electors to the Electoral College, who voted for president and vice president.

The State of Washington was won by Democratic nominee Barack Obama by a 17.1% margin of victory. Prior to the election, all 17 news organizations considered this a state Obama would win, or otherwise considered as a safe blue state. No Republican presidential nominee had won the State of Washington since Ronald Reagan won the state in 1984. Continuing on that trend, Washington stayed in the Democratic column as Obama carried the state with over 57% of the vote.

, this is the last election in which Skamania County, Klickitat County, and Wahkiakum County voted for the Democratic candidate. This is also the last time the Democrat carried more counties than the Republican.

Primaries

Democratic primary

The Democratic caucuses were a series of events held by the Washington State Democratic Party to determine the delegates that the Party sent to the 2008 Democratic National Convention. Delegates were selected in a four-tier process that began with precinct caucuses, was further refined in legislative district caucuses and/or county conventions, concluded for some delegates in the congressional district caucuses, and finally concluded for the remaining delegates at the state convention.

Washington also held a Democratic primary on February 19, 2008, but the Washington State Democratic Party did not use the results of the primary to determine its delegates.

Delegate breakdown

The Washington State Democratic Party sent a total of 97 delegates to the 2008 Democratic National Convention. Of those delegates, 78 were pledged and 19 were unpledged. The 78 pledged delegates were allocated (pledged) to vote for a particular candidate at the National Convention according to the results of Washington's four-step caucus process. The 19 unpledged delegates were popularly called "superdelegates" because their vote represented their personal decisions, whereas the regular delegates' votes represented the collective decision of many voters. The superdelegates were free to vote for any candidate at the National Convention and were selected by the Washington State Democratic Party's officials and the pledged delegates.

The 78 pledged delegates were further divided into 51 district delegates and 27 statewide delegates. The 51 district delegates were divided among Washington's 9 Congressional Districts and were allocated to the presidential candidates based on the caucus results in each District. The 27 statewide delegates were divided into 17 at-large delegates and 10 Party Leaders and Elected Officials (abbreviated PLEOs). They were allocated to the presidential candidates at the State Convention based on the preference of the 51 district delegates on June 13–15.

Of the 19 unpledged delegates, 17 were selected in advance and 2 were selected at the State Convention.  The delegates selected in advance were 7 Democratic National Committee members, the 2 Democratic U.S. Senators from Washington, Maria Cantwell and Patty Murray, the 6 Democratic U.S. Representatives from Washington, and the Democratic Governor of Washington, Christine Gregoire.

Delegate selection process

Precinct caucuses

The precinct caucuses took place on February 9, 2008. Washington's two senators, Patty Murray and Maria Cantwell, endorsed Senator Hillary Clinton earlier in the nomination season. The week before the caucuses, Washington's governor, Christine Gregoire, endorsed Senator Barack Obama.

The caucuses were open to all voters who would be 18 years old by November 4, 2008. To vote, participants completed a form with their contact information and candidate preference. The form also asked voters to sign an oath stating: "I declare that I consider myself to be a DEMOCRAT and I will not participate in the nomination process of any other political party for the 2008 Presidential election." In some caucus groups, members split into smaller groups according to the candidate they supported. Voters supporting non-viable candidates had the option of moving into viable groups, and voters in viable groups could change their preference. Unlike other state Democratic Party caucuses, Washington does not require a 15% threshold for allocation of delegates at the precinct level. Rules state that any fractional delegates remaining are awarded to the candidate with the most votes that do not have delegates.

Legislative District caucuses and County conventions

The second tier of the delegate selection process involved choosing 2,000 Legislative District delegates (and 1,000 alternates) to send to the Congressional District conventions on May 17 and the State Convention on June 13–15. There are 49 Legislative Districts in Washington State. Each district was allocated a certain number of delegates. Delegates were elected at either Legislative District caucuses or County conventions. Each of Washington's 39 counties has a local Democratic Party organization that determined the event at which delegate selection would take place. Most counties chose to select delegates at Legislative District caucuses on April 5. The remaining counties selected delegates at sub-caucuses during their County Conventions, most of which were held on either April 12 or April 19. The breakdown of events by date is listed below.

April 5 

Legislative District caucuses:
1st through 6th
8th
11th
12th
16th (Benton County portion only, held at the 8th LD caucus)
21st
25th through 34th
36th through 39th
40th (San Juan County portion only)
41st through 48th

County Convention:
Whatcom (40th LD)

April 12

County Conventions:
Clallam (24th LD)
Franklin (9th & 16th LDs)
Grays Harbor (19th, 24th & 35th LDs)
Kitsap (23rd & 35th LDs)
Kittitas (13th LD)
Pend Oreille (7th LD)
Skagit (10th & 40th LDs)

April 13

County Convention:
Snohomish (10th LD)

April 19

County Conventions:
Asotin (9th LD)
Chelan (13th LD)
Clark (15th, 17th, 18th & 49th LDs)
Cowlitz (18th & 19th LDs)
Ferry (7th LD)
Grant (13th LD)
Island (10th LD)
Klickitat (15th LD)
Lewis (20th LD)
Lincoln (7th LD)
Mason (35th LD)
Okanogan (7th LD)
Pacific (19th LD)
Skamania (15th LD)
Spokane (7th & 9th LDs)
Stevens (7th LD)
Thurston (20th, 22nd & 35th LDs)
Wahkiakum (19th LD)
Whitman (9th LD)
Yakima (13th, 14th & 15th LDs)

April 20

County Convention:
Walla Walla (16th LD)

April 26

County Convention:
Jefferson (24th LD)

Unknown date

County Conventions:
Adams (9th LD)
Garfield (9th LD)
Columbia (16th LD)

Congressional district caucuses

Fifty-one delegates were chosen at the nine congressional district caucuses. Each district was allotted a different number of delegates:

 CD 1: 6
 CD 2: 6
 CD 3: 5
 CD 4: 3
 CD 5: 5
 CD 6: 6
 CD 7: 9
 CD 8: 6
 CD 9: 5

State convention

Twenty-nine delegates were chosen at the state convention, twenty-seven of which were pledged to vote for a particular candidate. Seventeen of these pledged delegates were "at-large" delegates that did not represent a specific Washington congressional district, and ten were party leaders and elected officials (PLEOs).

Polls

Results

Precinct caucuses

Caucus date: February 9, 2008

National pledged delegates determined: 0 (of 78)

Primary

The Washington State Democratic Party did not use the results of the primary to determine its delegates.

Primary date: February 19, 2008

National pledged delegates determined: 0 (of 78)

Legislative district caucuses and county conventions

Dashes indicate districts for which results are unavailable.

Caucus/Convention dates: April 5–26, 2008

National pledged delegates determined: 0 (of 78)

Congressional district caucuses

Caucus date: May 17, 2008

National pledged delegates determined: 51 (of 78)

State convention

Convention date: June 13–15, 2008

National pledged delegates determined: 27 (of 78)

Republican caucuses and primary

The Republican caucuses were held on Saturday February 9 and the primary on February 19, 2008, to compete 40 total delegates, of which 18 tied to the caucuses, 19 tied to the primary, and 3 unpledged RNC member delegates.

Candidates
All following candidates appeared on the ballot for voters in Washington:

 Mike Huckabee
 John McCain
 Ron Paul
 Mitt Romney (candidate suspended his campaign)

Caucuses
Voting in Washington's caucuses closed at 9:00 pm EST February 9.

The Washington Republican Party declared John McCain the winner on the night of the election, after 87% of the votes were counted. Mike Huckabee disputed the results and accused the state party of calling the election prematurely.  He demanded a statewide caucus recount.  However, by Tuesday, February 12, the Washington Republicans again declared McCain the winner after 96% of the votes were tallied, and never counted the rest of the votes.

Primary
The primary took place on February 19, 2008.

* Candidate stopped campaign before primary

Money raised
The following table shows the amount of money each Republican Party candidate raised in the state of Washington.

Campaign

Predictions

Since February 28, Obama won every pre-election poll. Since September 22, he won each poll with a double-digit margin of victory. The final 3 polls averaged Obama leading 54% to 40%.

Fundraising
McCain raised a total of $2,697,999 in the state. Obama raised $16,518,208.

Advertising and visits
Obama and his interest groups spent $312,869. McCain and his interest groups spent just $2,264. The Democratic ticket visited the state once, while the Republican ticket did not visit at all.

Analysis
Washington once leaned Republican, like most of the Pacific Northwest. From 1952 to 1984, it only went Democratic twice—in 1964 and 1968. However, it has voted for the Democratic presidential nominee in every presidential election since 1988. Neither candidate seriously contested the state as it was viewed as a safe blue state. Like Oregon, the state is divided politically by the urban/rural divide and geographically by the Cascade Mountains. The two are related in that nearly all of the major cities lie west of the Cascades. Most of the state's population resides in Western Washington along the Pacific Coast and in highly urbanized areas like Seattle. The Seattle area, home to almost two-thirds of the state's population, is overwhelmingly Democratic. The rest of Western Washington leans Democratic as well, though the lean is not as pronounced as in the greater Seattle area. In contrast, Eastern Washington is very rural, and in many ways more similar to Idaho than Seattle. Republicans have had an edge here for many years, in part to its strong tinge of social conservatism. As a result, while Republicans typically win more counties, the overwhelming Democratic trend in the more-heavily populated western portion is enough to swing the whole state to the Democrats.

On Election Day, Obama won the state by 17.18%. Washington was called for Obama as soon as the polls in the state closed. He swept the more urban counties along the Western Seaboard, which compose the Democratic base. More than two-thirds of the state's population lives in this area; this makes it very difficult for a Republican to win the state because of this region's liberal tilt. Obama would have been assured a victory in any event due to his performance in the Seattle area. He carried King County, home to Seattle itself and its close suburbs and just over a third of the state's population, with 69.97 percent of the vote—almost three-fifths of his statewide majority. Obama also swept the two other big counties in Western Washington, Pierce (home to Tacoma) and Snohomish (home to Everett) by decisive margins. His combined majority in King, Pierce and Snohomish counties would have been more than enough to carry the state. McCain only won one county in the western part of the state, Lewis County, traditionally the most socially conservative county west of the Cascades.

On the other hand, McCain did extremely well in Eastern Washington. Neither Al Gore or John Kerry was able to take a single county in Eastern Washington; in 2008, Obama only won one small county, Whitman County, home to Washington State University in Pullman. Nevertheless, as with Oregon, McCain's margins in the eastern part of the state were far outweighed by Obama's landslides in the more populated coastal regions and cities in the western part of the state. Obama did, however, improve substantially in Eastern Washington, especially in the region's largest county, Spokane County, home to the city of Spokane.

During the same election, incumbent Democratic Governor Christine Gregoire was reelected to a second term with 53.00% of the vote over Republican Dino Rossi who took 46.55% in a rematch of their controversial race from four years earlier. At the state level, Democrats picked up one seat in the Washington House of Representatives while Republicans picked up a seat in the Washington Senate.

Results

By county

Counties that flipped from Republican to Democratic
 Clallam (largest community: Port Angeles)
 Clark (largest community: Vancouver)
 Island (largest city: Coupeville)
 Klickitat (largest city: Goldendale)
 Skagit (largest city: Mount Vernon)
 Skamania (largest community: Carson)
 Wahkhiakum (largest community: Puget Island)
 Whitman (largest city: Pulman)

By congressional district
Barack Obama carried 7 of the state's 9 congressional districts, including one district held by a Republican.

Electors

Technically the voters of Washington cast their ballots for electors: representatives to the Electoral College. Washington is allocated 11 electors because it has 9 congressional districts and 2 senators. All candidates who appear on the ballot or qualify to receive write-in votes must submit a list of 11 electors, who pledge to vote for their candidate and their running mate. Whoever wins the majority of votes in the state is awarded all 11 electoral votes. Their chosen electors then vote for president and vice president. Although electors are pledged to their candidate and running mate, they are not obligated to vote for them. An elector who votes for someone other than their candidate is known as a faithless elector.

The electors of each state and the District of Columbia met on December 15, 2008, to cast their votes for president and vice president. The Electoral College itself never meets as one body. Instead the electors from each state and the District of Columbia met in their respective capitols.

The following were the members of the Electoral College from the state. All 11 were pledged to Barack Obama and Joe Biden:
Jeff Siddiqui
Maggie Hanson
Jane Buchanan‐Banks
Pat M. Notter
Marcus Riccelli
Bradford Donovan
Lesley Ahmed
Di A. Irons
Calvin Edwards
Kristine Fallstone
John Daniels

See also
 United States presidential elections in Washington (state)
 Presidency of Barack Obama

References

External links
 Official Washington Presidential election results

2008 Washington (state) elections
2008
Washington